CKC is a three-letter acronym that may stand for:

 Canadian Kennel Club, one of the national kennel clubs of Canada
 Canoe Kayak Canada
 Cervical conization, cold knife conization
 Chicago–Kansas City Expressway
 Capital Kids' Cricket, charity, London, UK
 Christ the King College, Onitsha, or CKC Onitsha, Nigeria
 CKC Chinese Input System
 Closed kinetic chain exercises, physical exercises performed where the hand  or foot is fixed in space and cannot move
 The IATA code for Cherkasy International Airport, Cherkasy Oblast, Ukraine